Filippo Artioli (born 25 January 1998) is an Italian football player. He plays for Mezzolara.

Club career

SPAL
On 11 July 2018, he joined Serie C club Viterbese Castrense on loan. He made his Serie C debut for Viterbese Castrense on 5 December 2018 in a game against Bisceglie, as a 79th-minute substitute for Bismark Ngissah.

Imolese
On 17 July 2019, he signed a 1-year contract with Serie C club Imolese.

Mezzolara
On 31 August 2020 he joined Mezzolara.

References

External links
 

1998 births
Sportspeople from Ferrara
Living people
Italian footballers
Association football midfielders
U.S. Viterbese 1908 players
Imolese Calcio 1919 players
A.S.D. Mezzolara players
Serie C players
Footballers from Emilia-Romagna